Tarif Akhand (born 11 June 1998) is an Indian professional footballer who plays as a defender for I-League club RoundGlass Punjab.

Club career
Akhand began his career in the youth system of I-League club Pune. He soon left the club to join Chennai City. He made his professional debut for the club in the I-League on 2 January 2018 against Mohun Bagan. He started and played the whole match as Chennai City won 2–1.

After the 2017–18 I-League concluded, Akhand was loaned to Pune City Reserves in the I-League 2nd Division.

Hyderabad
Prior to the 2019–20 season, it was announced that Akhand had signed with Hyderabad of the Indian Super League. He made his club debut on 2 November 2019 against Kerala Blasters. Akhand came on as an 88th-minute substitute for Robin Singh as Hyderabad won 2–1.

On 5 January 2020, Akhand was loaned out to Chennai City. He made his debut for the club four days later on 9 January against Gokulam Kerala. He started and played just 38 minutes as Chennai City won 3–2.

Rajasthan United
On 16 December 2021, Akhand agreed to join Rajasthan United on a season-long deal.

On 21 March 2022, he made his debut for the club against Churchill Brothers, in a 2–0 win.

Career statistics

Club

Honours
Chennai City
I-League: 2018–19

References

External links
Profile at the AIFF website
Profile at the Hyderabad FC website

1998 births
Living people
Footballers from West Bengal
Indian footballers
Association football defenders
Pune FC players
Chennai City FC players
Hyderabad FC players
I-League players
I-League 2nd Division players
Indian Super League players
FC Pune City players
Rajasthan United FC players